Vlčice is a municipality and village in Jeseník District in the Olomouc Region of the Czech Republic. It has about 400 inhabitants.

Administrative parts

Villages and hamlets of Bergov, Dolní Les and Vojtovice are administrative parts of Vlčice.

Twin towns – sister cities

Vlčice is twinned with:
 Biała, Poland

References

Villages in Jeseník District
Czech Silesia